Simon Freund (born 28 September 1996) is a Swedish tennis player.

Freund has a career high ATP singles ranking of 677 achieved on 16 November 2020. He also has a career high ATP doubles ranking of 361 achieved on 2 March 2020.

Career
Freund made his ATP main draw debut at the 2021 Stockholm Open after entering the doubles main draw as an alternate with Nino Serdarušić.

Freund played college tennis at the Louisiana State University.  and thereafter at 
University of California, Santa Barbara.

References

External links

1996 births
Living people
Swedish male tennis players
Tennis players from Stockholm
UC Santa Barbara Gauchos men's tennis players